Rolf Pettersson (26 March 1953 – 8 July 2015) was a Swedish swimmer. He competed in the men's 200 metre freestyle at the 1972 Summer Olympics.

References

External links
 

1953 births
2015 deaths
Olympic swimmers of Sweden
Swimmers at the 1972 Summer Olympics
Sportspeople from Uppsala
Swedish male freestyle swimmers
20th-century Swedish people
21st-century Swedish people